Acrostictomyia is a genus of  picture-winged fly in the family Ulidiidae.

Species
Acrostictomyia longistigma
Acrostictomyia subapicalis

References

Ulidiidae
Brachycera genera